Sir William Valters Summers Gradwell-Goodwin (22 February 1862 – 26 January 1942) was the Mayor of Newcastle-under-Lyme, Staffordshire, England, from 1913 to 1920. He was knighted in the 1920 New Year Honours for his services to the town during the First World War.

Footnotes

1862 births
1942 deaths
Mayors of places in Staffordshire
Knights Bachelor
People from Braintree, Essex